Heritage Polytechnic, Eket, Akwa Ibom state, is a privately owned polytechnic institute located in Ikot Udota, Eket local Government Area of Akwa Ibom State, Nigeria.

Background 
The institution founded by Emmanuel J. Ekott who is a Chemical Engineer took off in 1996 as Christian Continuing Education Centre. By 1999, it metamorphosed to Christian Institute of Continuing Education. In 2000, the institution became known as Heritage College and it was licensed by the National Board for Technical Education as a Polytechnic in 2010.

Courses 
The institution has four Faculties and runs their programmes under these departments;

Faculty of Engineering

 Department of Computer Engineering
 Department of Electrical and Electronic Engineering

Faculty of Environmental Studies

 Department of Estate Management
 Department of Quantity Surveying
 Department of Building Technology

Faculty of Management Sciences

 Department of Mass Communication
 Department of Business Administration and Management
 Department of Accountancy
 Department of Marketing
 Department of Public Administration
 Department of Theology

Faculty of Science and Technology

 Department of Computer Science
 Department of Science Laboratory Technology
 Department of Statistics
 Department of Biochemistry
 Department of Environmental Biology
 Department of Microbiology
 Department of Physics and Electronics

See also 
List of Polytechnics in Nigeria

References

External links 
 

Education in Akwa Ibom State
Polytechnics in Nigeria